Autophila einsleri is a moth of the family Erebidae first described by Hans Georg Amsel in 1935. It is found in Turkey, Jordan, Cyprus, the Caucasus, Syria, Iraq, Iran, Lebanon, Israel, Turkmenistan and Oman.

The wingspan is about 37 mm. There are two generations per year. Adults are on wing from May to July and October.

Subspecies
Autophila einsleri einsleri
Autophila einsleri luxuriosa

References

External links
Species info
Image

Toxocampina
Moths of Europe
Moths of Asia
Taxa named by Hans Georg Amsel
Moths described in 1935